Kip Brennan (born August 27, 1980) is a Canadian former professional hockey enforcer. Brennan played for the Los Angeles Kings, Atlanta Thrashers, Mighty Ducks of Anaheim and the New York Islanders in the National Hockey League (NHL).

Playing career
Kip Brennan played in the OHL with the Windsor Spitfires and Sudbury Wolves from 1996–2001.  He led the Wolves in penalty minutes for the 1999–2000 season with 228 regular season PIM and 67 playoff PIM.  In 2001, he split time with the Lowell Lock Monsters, of the AHL, and the Sudbury Wolves, OHL.  The 2001–2002 season would give Kip his first taste of the NHL.  He skated in 4 games for the LA Kings and picked up 22 PIM.  For the remainder of the season he played for the Manchester Monarchs, the AHL affiliate for the Los Angeles Kings.  He led the team in PIM with 269.

In 2002–03 and 2003–04, he was back and forth between the Kings and Monarchs.  Kip again led the Monarchs with 198 PIM for the 2002–03 season. On December 27, 2003, the NHL suspended Brennan for 10 games without pay during a game against the San Jose Sharks. Brennan had returned to the ice after officials had ejected him for roughing an opponent. The suspension cost him about $25,000. He also played for the Atlanta Thrashers of the NHL for 5 games during the 2003–04 season.  2004–05, he played exclusively for the Chicago Wolves of the AHL, leading the team in PIM with 267 during the regular season and 105 PIM in the playoffs.  2005–06, he played for the Mighty Ducks of Anaheim, NHL, and the Portland Pirates, AHL.

He briefly attended the Dallas Stars training camp in September 2006. Then for the 2006–07 season, Kip skated 1 game for the Toronto Marlies in the AHL, 11 games for the Long Beach Ice Dogs in the ECHL, and then finished the season with the Hershey Bears.  He then signed with the New York Islanders, playing 3 games with the team, spending most of the season with the Bridgeport Sound Tigers.

Brennan then signed with HIFK in Finland's SM-liiga, but on 16 December 2008, he left the team and returned to Hershey Bears.

On November 11, 2013, Brennan returned to Russia to sign a one-year contract with Saryarka Karaganda of the Higher Hockey League. In 10 games Brennan totalled 35 penalty minutes in helping Karaganda advance to the post-season.

Career statistics

References

External links 
 

1980 births
Living people
Allen Americans players
Arizona Sundogs players
Atlanta Thrashers players
Bridgeport Sound Tigers players
Canadian ice hockey left wingers
Canadian people of Irish descent
Chicago Wolves players
Hershey Bears players
HIFK (ice hockey) players
Ice hockey people from Ontario
Sportspeople from Kingston, Ontario
Long Beach Ice Dogs (ECHL) players
Los Angeles Kings draft picks
Los Angeles Kings players
Lowell Lock Monsters players
Manchester Monarchs (AHL) players
Mighty Ducks of Anaheim players
New York Islanders players
Portland Pirates players
Saryarka Karagandy players
South Carolina Stingrays players
Springfield Falcons players
Sudbury Wolves players
Toronto Marlies players
Windsor Spitfires players
Canadian expatriate ice hockey players in Finland